Hugo Passalacqua (born in Oberá, Argentina, on 20 November 1957) is an Argentine politician. He served as vice governor of Misiones Province from 2011 to 2015, under Governor Maurice Closs, and served as Governor of Misiones Province from 10 December 2015 to 10 December 2019.

References

Governors of Misiones Province
Vice Governors of Misiones Province
Living people
People from Oberá
1957 births